McArthur is an unincorporated community in Modoc County, California.

References

Unincorporated communities in California
Unincorporated communities in Modoc County, California